Amphidromus arlingi is a species of air-breathing tree snail, an arboreal gastropod mollusk in the family Camaenidae.

Distribution 
This species is recorded in Vietnam.

Habitat 
Tree dwellers.

Etymology 
This species is named after Nico Arling.

Subspecies 
There are two subspecies of Amphidromus arlingi:

 Amphidromus arlingi arlingi Thach, 2017
 Amphidromus arlingi daklakensis Thach, 2017

References 

arlingi
Gastropods described in 2017